Oscar De La Hoya vs. Felix Sturm, billed as Collision Course, was a professional boxing match contested on June 5, 2004 for the WBO middleweight championship.

Background
Following a controversial loss to Shane Mosley that cost him the WBA and WBC light-middleweight titles in September 2003, Oscar De La Hoya announced his intentions to move up to the middleweight division to challenge undefeated WBO champion Felix Sturm, followed by a unification bout with Undisputed Middleweight Champion Bernard Hopkins should he defeat Sturm. As a precursor to their planned fight, Hopkins and De La Hoya agreed to take part in a joint doubleheader pay-per-view event broadcast by HBO dubbed "Collision Course". Hopkins would first take on his mandatory challenger in Robert Allen (who had fought Hopkins twice before in the late 90s), winning easily by unanimous decision to retain his titles. The Hopkins–Allen fight was then followed by the main event between De La Hoya and Sturm, with De La Hoya needing a victory in order to preserve his match with Hopkins.

The fight
The fight would go the full 12 rounds with De La Hoya ultimately winning the bout by a close unanimous decision with three scores of 115–113 (the judges having De La Hoya winning seven rounds to Sturm's five). The decision was met with controversy as the Compubox punch stats showed that Sturm had a clear edge over De La Hoya in nearly every category. Sturm would land 234 of his 541 thrown punches for a 43% success rate, and though De La Hoya would throw well over 200 more punches than Sturm, landed only 188 of his 792 for only a 24% success rate. Sturm also dominated De La Hoya with his jab, landing 112 jabs to De La Hoya's 58. De La Hoya narrowly outlanded Sturm in power punches, connecting with 130 of 394 for 33%, however, Sturm still managed to land over half of his power punches going 122 of 235 for 52%. After the bell had sounded, Sturm celebrated, thinking he had done enough to earn the victory. HBO commentators Jim Lampley and Roy Jones Jr. both felt Sturm had clearly won, while unofficial scorer Harold Lederman also had Sturm the winner with the score of 115–113, scoring six of the last seven rounds for Sturm. Though the winner, De La Hoya expressed disappointment, saying of his performance, "Everything went wrong tonight". Sturm, who felt that De La Hoya had been gifted the decision due to his popularity and to preserve the lucrative De La Hoya–Hopkins fight, said "I know Oscar is a big name here and a great champion, but tonight, I think the whole world saw who was the better fighter." Hopkins, after nearly seeing both the biggest match and payday of his career go down the drain joked that his "blood pressure went up slightly" before the decision was announced.

Fight card

Aftermath
Using the official punch stats as proof, Sturm launched an official protest shortly after the fight in hopes of overturning the decision. However, Nevada Athletic Commission director Marc Ratner turned down Sturm's protest, stating "Scoring is subjective, so unless someone can prove a mathematical mistake or collusion, there is no basis for a protest."

Despite De La Hoya's less-than-stellar performance, his fight with Hopkins was officially announced two days later. For the first time in his career, De La Hoya came into the 6 as the underdog, with Hopkins being a 2–1 favorite. De La Hoya was behind on two of the three scorecards before Hopkins ended the fight with a body shot that put him down for the count in the ninth round.

References

External links
 BoxRec fight analysis

2004 in boxing
Boxing matches involving Oscar De La Hoya
Boxing in Las Vegas
2004 in sports in Nevada
June 2004 sports events in the United States
MGM Grand Garden Arena